, Air Canada operates the following aircraft, from Airbus and Boeing. For regional flying, see Air Canada Express and its sole operator Jazz Aviation. For Rouge aircraft, see Air Canada Rouge.

Air Canada received the world's first airline-operated 737 MAX full-flight simulator in 2017.

Current fleet

Gallery

Historical fleet

 Air Canada's Douglas DC-8-63 fleet was withdrawn from passenger service in 1983. Six of these were converted to DC-8-73F freighters in 1984 and retained for use by Air Canada Cargo eventually being sold off between 1990 and 1994.
 Air Canada's Douglas DC-9-15s were used up to 1968. One DC-9-32CF was used for cargo flights until 1977. The McDonnell Douglas DC-9-32s were used from 1967 to 2002.
 Air Canada's Canadair CRJ-100 aircraft were used from the mid 1990s until the early 2000s when they were transferred to regional affiliate Jazz Air LP operating as Air Canada Jazz.
 Air Canada's Airbus A340-500s were retired in November 2007 and replaced by Boeing 777-200LRs.
 Air Canada's Airbus A340-300s were retired in November 2008 and replaced by Boeing 777-300ERs.
 Air Canada's Boeing 767-200ER fleet was retired from service by the end of 2008.
 The McDonnell Douglas DC-10-30 aircraft were operated from 1979 to 2000 by Canadian Pacific Air Lines and its successors Canadian Airlines International.
 The Boeing 737-200 aircraft were operated from 1968 to 2000 by Canadian Pacific Air Lines and its successors Canadian Airlines International. Subsequent to the merger with Canadian Airlines International, Air Canada operated these aircraft in a mainline two-class configuration, as well as in an all-economy class configuration with the Air Canada Tango and the Zip low-cost carrier brands.
 In 2020, Air Canada retired their entire Embraer E190 and Boeing 767-300ER fleets. The Embraer E190s were replaced by the Airbus A220-300 and Boeing 737 MAX 8, while the Boeing 767-300ER was replaced by the Airbus A330-300 and Boeing 787s. As of December 2021, certain previously retired Boeing 767-300ER (legacy passenger variant) aircraft are being converted and reintroduced into the fleet as Boeing 767-300ER/BDSF cargo aircraft.
Air Canada additionally planned to completely retire its Airbus A319 fleet in May 2020, replacing them with further Airbus A220-300s. The mainline A319s were tentatively retired later than previously planned on February 7, 2021, with the final mainline A319 operating a flight from Calgary to Phoenix; however, Air Canada continued to operate A319s as part of its charter fleet under Air Canada Jetz. Subsequently, mainline A319 service resumed in March 2022. As of November 2022, Air Canada operates 2 A319s as part of its mainline fleet with 1 A319 operating for Jetz.

Aircraft that Air Canada has operated since 1937, but are no longer in the fleet:

British Aerospace 146-200 and Fokker F28 jet aircraft were operated by regional airline affiliates of Air Canada via code sharing agreements.

References

Air Canada
Lists of aircraft by operator